The following is a list of football stadiums in Austria, ordered by capacity. Currently stadiums with a capacity of 5,000 or more are included.

See also

Football in Austria
List of football clubs in Austria
List of European stadiums by capacity
List of association football stadiums by capacity

Austria
Football stadiums
Stadiums